Bradley Stoke is a town in South Gloucestershire, England, situated   northeast of Bristol, It is near the Severn Estuary of the Bristol Channel, which is an extension of the North Atlantic Ocean, separating South Wales from South West England. Bradley Stoke is bordered by three motorways; the M5 to the north, the M4 to the east and the M32 to the south.

Planned in the 1970s, building works began in 1987. Bradley Stoke was Europe's largest new town built with private investment and was named after the local Bradley Brook and Stoke Brook streams. Bradley Stoke along with nearby Filton and suburbs form part of the North Bristol urban area. The town has become an overflow settlement for Bristol city.

History
The area that is now Bradley Stoke, was once farmland north of the village of Stoke Gifford near Bristol city. The land was divided amongst the  civil parishes of Stoke Gifford, Almondsbury, Patchway and Winterbourne. The area consisted of a number of farms, Bailey's Court and Watch Elm Farm in the south, Bowsland Farm and Manor Farm in the north and Webb's Farm in the middle. Some of the lands were used as pasture. A number of woods also existed, Sherbourne's Brake, Webb's Wood and the large Savage's Wood have all been preserved. Fiddlers Wood, the name of which lives on in Fiddlers Wood Lane was all but obliterated by the M4 motorway. Baileys Court Farmhouse is the only original building that still remains and was used as offices by the town's developers before becoming the Bailey's Court Inn. Watch Elm Farm was named after the Watch Elm, an elm of a legendary size that blew down in the mid 18th century. The Stoke Brook flows through the middle of Bradley Stoke.

During its development, the new settlement faced some problems in the wake of a national recession. At the time, Bradley Stoke was reputed to be one of Europe's largest private housing developments and did struggle to develop at first to establish itself as an identifiable town unlike other earlier new towns which were supported by a New Town Development Corporation, as the settlement relied principally on private investment within a restricted statutory framework of the local authority Northavon District Council within the Avon County Council area. A combination of private housebuilders led the development and with only limited input from commercial businesses and the consequent recession resulted in the new town gaining a reputation for being a soulless housing estate with only limited facilities and no town centre, with the exception of a Tesco supermarket. High-interest rates during the early 1990s soon led to the collapse of the property market in the area with many new homes falling into negative equity. This led to the branding of the new town as 'Sadly Broke' until property values and the development market began to recover. Since 1987, the residents of the area were demanding the establishment of a separate Town Council to coordinate the community's civic life and in 1991 formation of the Town Council was in principle approved. On the 1st of April 1992, the newly elected Town Council took charge.

Governance

The area that covers Bradley Stoke was historically part of Gloucestershire County. From 1974 until 1996, Bradley Stoke was part of the Northavon district of the Avon county. However, when Avon County was abolished in 1996 in favour of unitary authorities, the area became part of the newly formed South Gloucestershire, which covers the northern and eastern parts of the Greater Bristol region. Bradley Stoke forms part of the Bristol postcode area (mainly BS32 postcode and a few parts of BS36 postcode).

Bradley Stoke Town Council is the primary tier of the local government of the town and has overall responsibility for the community's well-being. Town Council’s functions fall into three main categories, 1. Represent the local community 2. Deliver services to meet local needs and 3. Strive to improve the quality of life in the local area. The Town Council has the power to enact and enforce bye-laws for public convenience. As per law, the Town Council provide, maintain or contribute to the following services: Allotments, Promotion of growing fruits or vegetables or domestic produce, Recreation, Leisure facilities, Bus shelters, Car parks, Local Illuminations, Conference facilities, Community Centres, Public buildings, Town Hall, Burial grounds, Crematoriums, Public Cemeteries, Local youth projects, community safety schemes, parks and open spaces, play areas, community transport schemes, Town Planning consultations, Building consultations, Crime reduction measures, Street Cleaning, Street lighting, Litter bins, Drainage, Public lavatories, Cycle paths, Upkeep of Highway verges, Promotion of Tourism activities, Entertainments, Arts, Festivals and celebrations, Traffic calming measures, Traffic signs, War memorials, and many more. Bradley Stoke Town Council liaison with the South Gloucestershire Council, which acts as its principal authority for Education, Community Learning, Economic Development, Electoral Services, Registrations, Housing, Planning applications, Strategic planning, Transport planning, Passenger transport, Highways, Street Care, Parking Enforcement, Adult Social Care, Children's Social Care, Social Services, Libraries, Leisure and recreation, Waste collection, Waste disposal, Recycling, Environmental Health, Trading Standards, Revenue collection, Safeguarding and Community Safety. The Bradley Stoke Town Council in its vision has committed to promoting and developing the interests and diversity of its vibrant community.

Bradley Stoke has a Town Council made up of 15 Councillors elected from three wards (6 from Bradley Stoke North, 7 from Bradley Stoke South and 2 from Stoke Brook) to administer the local issues. The Town Council is chaired by the Town Mayor and assisted by a Deputy Mayor. The Council Spokesperson and the Chairs of the Standing Committees also play a significant part in the Council activities. The three standing committees act as deliberative wings of the Council. The policies and decisions of the council are carried out by officers and staff, employed by the Council headed by the Town Clerk.

Bradley Stoke Town is represented in the South Gloucestershire Council by seven Councillors elected from three electoral wards, namely Bradley Stoke North, Bradley Stoke South and Stoke Gifford (Stoke Brook). Since 2017, there is a West of England Combined Authority (WECA), which spans across Bristol, South Gloucestershire and Bath and North East Somerset counties, and is headed by an elected Metro Mayor, with responsibilities of strategic planning, economy, skills and transport in the region. The Avon and Somerset Police, which is headed by an elected Police Commissioner (responsible for securing an “effective and efficient” police force, and drafting police budgets and police policies) and professionally controlled by a chief constable, manages police operations in Bradley Stoke and the West of England region. Bradley Stoke occupies the central part of the Filton and Bradley Stoke parliamentary constituency, which elects one Member of Parliament (MP). First elected in 2010, Conservative MP Jack Lopresti is the MP for Filton and Bradley Stoke.

Town Council

The membership of the town council, after the council elections held in May 2019, and the by-elections in May 2021 and May 2022, is shown in the table below.

Twin cities
Bradley Stoke is twinned with Champs-sur-Marne, France located in the Paris suburbs.

Facilities
Many of the facilities in the town were to be funded by the housing developers from housing sales, via 'Section 106' planning agreements. When house building and sales slowed for a time in the late 80s, there was a significant slowdown in facility completion. This included the late provision of the road joining the north and south sides of the town, and also the completion of the doctors' surgery.

The new town centre 'Willow Brook' was named by an anonymous resident as part of a competition run by Bradley Stoke Town Council in partnership with Tesco. The centre is situated on the original Tesco supermarket site, and the redevelopment was approved by South Gloucestershire Council on 13 November 2006.

Council
The Bradley Stoke Town Council operates three activity centres located at The Bradley Stoke Jubilee Centre on Savages Wood Road, Baileys Court Activity Centre on Baileys Court Road and Brook Way Activity Centre on Brook Way. Each activity centre offers rooms and facilities to hiring, and the provision of sports activities such as bowls, football pitches and hardball courts.

Housing
There are over 9000 residential homes in the Bradley Stoke area. 1,600 properties or nearly 18% of properties are registered for social housing.

Bradley Stoke North 
To the north of the town (often referred to as Bradley Stoke North—because building in the town was originally in two locations, north and south, eventually working towards the centre:  for many years the two sites were separated by an expanse of green fields) there are a number of other facilities on Pear Tree Road. Including a Tesco Express, Prime Time Recruitment, Coral, a beauty salon, a cafe and two fast-food takeaway establishments. In addition, the town is served by an Aldi store (on the former Somerfield site.). Between Pear Tree Road and the RAC tower, there is a Toby Carvery (formerly the Orchard Pub).

Near the Aldi supermarket, there is a pub named the Hollow Tree.  The former pub on the site, the Bradley Stoke, closed down in September 2012, when the site was sold to Marstons, a brewery and pub operator.  The new pub opened in March 2013, and gained a "Pizza Kitchen" in renovations in 2016.

Willow Brook Centre, the town centre 
Willow Brook Centre opened on 13 October 2008. Stores at Willow Brook Shopping Centre include Tesco Extra,  Boots, Card Factory, Children's Hospice South West, Costa Coffee, Domino's Pizza, EE, F&F, Giant Bicycles, Greggs, Harvester, Holland & Barrett, KFC, Ladbrokes, O2, Pets at Home, Poundstretcher, Reflections, Specsavers, Subway, Tanning Shop, The Food Warehouse by Iceland, Timpson, The Works, Vision Express. Services at the Willow Brook Shopping Centre include Anytime Fitness, Aspirations, BT, CJ Hole, Explore Learning, Kumon, Leading Edge, Lionbridge, Logical, My Dentist, Ocean, Reed, Taylors, Waves car wash and Willow Clinic.

Bradley Stoke Leisure Centre and library 

The Active leisure centre near the town centre provides access to a 25m swimming pool and a public library. Additional services at the leisure centre include a gym, beauty salon, Soho Coffee and a skate park. The leisure centre and library are host to many in house and local activity groups.

In 2018, as part of renovations reducing the size of the sports hall, a small climbing centre was installed.

The Soho coffee shop was established in June 2013 and was renovated in 2017.

Bradley Stoke South 
The south of Bradley Stoke (referred to as Bradley Stoke South) has a number of facilities in Bailey's Court, this included a Tesco Express store, a solicitors' firm, Ocean Homes Estate office, St Peter Hospice, a nursery, the Beijing Restaurant and Bailey's Court Inn pub.

Employment
Employment opportunities are found along Great Stoke Way to the south, Woodlands Business Park and Almondsbury Business Park to the north, and at the Aztec West development. The town is served by the nearby Bristol Parkway railway station in Stoke Gifford and is a short distance from the Ministry of Defence, the Aviva Centre and the Abbeywood Retail Park. Situated in the surrounding business parks are companies including RAC, Paragon, DHL, Greencore, Pukka Herbs, EE, GE Capital, HSS Hire, Zuken Technology Centre, and various hotels, production factories, courier services, warehouses and offices. The business parks are facilitated by cafes and restaurants including Starbucks and Turtle Bay.

The further developments of the Willow Brook Centre and the addition of larger high street chains have increased the number of jobs available for local residents as well as boosted trade within Bradley Stoke. Businesses continue to be interested in the further development of the town centre, such as the planning application to build drive-through commercial units adjacent to Bradley Stoke Way.

Bradley Stoke attracts custom through passing trade from those exiting and joining the motorways and commuting, however since the expansion of the Willow Brook Centre both business owners and potential employees are attracted to the area. Despite the available employment opportunities, many residents commute from Bradley Stoke to central Bristol, The Mall in Cribbs Causeway or via the nearby motorway junction for work.

Education

Primary schools 

 Saint Marys Catholic Primary School
 Bailey's Court Primary School
 Wheatfield Primary School
 Meadowbrook Primary School
 Holy Trinity Primary School
 Bowsland Green Primary School
 Bradley Stoke Community Primary School

Secondary schools 

 Bradley Stoke Community School, the comprehensive secondary school, opened in September 2005 and has the capacity for up to 1,120 students. A post-16 centre at the school was completed in Summer 2010, and a primary school extension was completed in 2015.

Transport

Rail
Bradley Stoke is served by Bristol Parkway railway station to the south and Patchway railway station to the west, both operated by Great Western Railway.

Bus
Bus services are operated by First West of England and Stagecoach West offering transport links to Aztec West, Thornbury, Cribbs Causeway, Bristol Parkway railway Station, Bristol city centre and the University of the West of England, Bristol. A new MetroBus service was introduced by Bristol Community Transport under contract by FirstGroup.

Car
Bradley Stoke borders the M5 to the north, the M4 to the east and the M32 to the south. Main transport routes are via Aztec West and via the Stoke Gifford bypass to the south.

Community

Community festival
The Bradley Stoke Community Festival has been running since 2004 and is held over a weekend in June. The festival hosts a variety of activities and events primarily aimed at young children and families involving live music, performances, sports and games.

Carnival
A Bradley Stoke Community Carnival event took place in 2014, 2015 and 2017. The carnival hosted stilt walkers, a brass band, performers dressed in costumes, competitions and prizes and live music.

Wheatfest
Similarly to the Bradley Stoke Community Festival, Wheatfest is an annual event hosted by a local group Friends of Wheatfield Primary School. The event on the grounds of Wheatfield Primary School is primarily aimed at young children and families. The 2019 event raised over £6000.

Summer beach
The Willow Brook Centre provides a summer beach in the town centre. Primarily aimed at young children and families, the Centre features a 38-tonne sandpit, dozens of deck chairs, and suspended decorations.

Fireworks
The Town Council operates an annual fireworks display in early November to celebrate Guy Fawkes Night, in 2018 raising over £2000 in support of West of England MS Therapy Centre and the Stroke Association.

Stars of the Stokes
Since 2016, the Willow Brook Centre has hosted the annual Stars of the Stokes Awards to recognise the local heroes in our community featuring special guest celebrities. Awards are issued to a champion carer, a parent in a million, coach of the year, high achievement, a young person of the year and teacher of the year. The event is sponsored by Tesco, Honeyfield, Aztec Hotel & Spa, First Bus, Bradley Stoke Radio, Olympus Academy Trust, Carisway, Bradley Stoke Radio and Frome Valley Voice.

Rotary club
The Bradley Stoke Rotary Club hosts a variety of meetings and events such as knitting and the annual barn dance, the 2018 dance raising £600 for Bristol Children's Charity.

Quiz nights
The local Baileys Court Inn and Three Brooks Pub host regular quiz nights, as does the Hollow Tree.

Christmas Lights
Each year the town is adorned with lights to celebrate Christmas. Along with an annual Christmas tree and decorations in the town centre, courtesy of the Willow Brook Centre, one property in Elm Close raises funds each year for St Peters Hospice by decorating their home in 30,000 lights. In 2018, over £3000 was raised.

Remembrance Service and War Memorial
A War Memorial was created in 2014 by the 1st Bradley Stoke Scout group & the Willow Brook Centre. It is located in the main town square and is a generic memorial dedicated to “all members of our Armed Forces (and civilians who support them) who have died or suffered due to conflict.” It is a simple grey granite pillar with a poppy design at the top & an inscription in the middle (as voted for by nearly 250 local residents) – 'At the going down of the sun and in the morning we will remember them'. There is a Scout Memorial badge (the scout arrowhead surrounded by olive branches & the inscription 'Lest we forget') at the base of the pillar. The memorial was designed and crafted by local Master Mason Alwyn Leek from Bristol and West Memorials. It was created because the town of Bradley Stoke is relatively new (major construction began only in the 1980s) and therefore had no traditional memorial. The aim was to create a focal point to hold Remembrance ceremonies for future generations with special involvement from the young people of the town. On 2 August 2014, this memorial was officially dedicated by Dame Janet Trotter, DBE, Lord Lieutenant for Gloucestershire. The dedication ceremony was also a commemoration of the Centenary of the First World War and it was attended by members of the 1st Bradley Stoke Scout Group, Royal British Legion, St John's Ambulance Cadets, 1st Bradley Stoke Rainbows, 2nd Patchway Scout Group and Police Cadets. A parade marched from the Jubilee Centre to the town square at the Willow Brook Centre, led by the band of the City of Bristol Pipes and Drums. At the end of the ceremony, the young people present were invited to help light the 100 candles around the memorial to mark the Centenary. The central candle was the official Royal British Legion candle for their 'Lights Out' campaign. The inaugural Bradley Stoke Remembrance Sunday Ceremony was held on the 9th of November 2014, attended by many local uniformed youth groups and approximately 300 members of the public.

Since the creation of the war memorial, an annual Remembrance parade and ceremony is held at the Willowbrook Centre, attended by the Town Mayor, 1st Bradley Stoke Scouts, Trident Explorer Unit, 1st Little Stoke Scout Group, 1st Stokeway Rainbows, 1st Bradley Stoke Rainbows, Brownies and Guides, 2nd Bradley Stoke Brownies, 2nd Stoke Lodge Brownies, a representative from the town council, and the local church vicar.

Woodland

The Woodland area of Bradley Stoke is named Three Brooks Local Nature Reserve, an area of approximately  that includes bluebell woods, rough grassland, brooks, ponds, and the man-made Three Brooks Lake. The lake, part of the Frome Valley Relief Sewer, is home to many common species of waterfowl including nesting swans. There are also a number of other walks and paths surrounded by small wooded areas connecting various parts of Bradley Stoke. Wild fruit can be found throughout the woodland, namely blackberries, apples, plums and cherries. A community orchard grows in the heart of the woodland.

The local Stokes Art Group (SAG) and the Three Brooks Nature Conservation Group (TBNCG) teamed up for an art project to personify the God of Three Brooks Nature Reserve. The God was named Trolletheus, named after two rusted supermarket trolleys dredged from the man-made lake.

Regular woodland walks and foraging groups are conducted in the local woodland hosted by the Three Brooks Conservation Group. In May 2019, the Three Brooks Nature Conservation Group were awarded a grant of £25,000 from Enovert Community Trust to improve accessibility to the woodland through renovations to walkways.

Sport

Bowls
The Bradley Stoke Bowls Club was opened in May 2010 at the Baileys Court Activity Centre.

Cricket
Bradley Stoke Cricket Club was formed in September 1990 and became the founder users of the newly built pavilion in Baileys Court Road under the management of the Bradley Stoke Town Council (now part of the Baileys Court  Activity Centre). The club joined the Bristol and District Cricket Association (B&D) in 1991 and played its first game in 1992.

In 2019 Bradley Stoke CC won the Tony Hitch T/20 Trophy - the first in their history.

In 2021 the club retained the Tony Hitch trophy after no competition in 2020. The first club to achieve this in over 20 years.

In August 2021 The club's 1st XI won promotion to the West of England Premier League for the 1st time in the club's history.

Football
The town's local football teams are Bradley Stoke Town FC and Bradley Stoke Youth FC.

Skate park
There is a well-lit modern concrete skate park located at the Bradley Stoke Active Leisure Centre, under the ownership and supervision of the Bradley Stoke Town Council.

Running
Bradley Stoke is popular with joggers and runners along the many pedestrian and cycle routes in the town as well as in the local woodland. The town hosts a 10  km event, with locals competing against each other to run a course across the length of the town.

Tennis
Tennis lessons, games and events are played at the Jubilee Centre on Savages Wood Road.

Martial arts
Numerous Martial arts and fitness clubs provide classes within the town teaching Judo, Taekwondo, Bushido , Kung-fu and kickboxing.

Media

Printed
Bradley Stoke's news and media publications include Bradley Stoke Matters and The Bradley Stoke Journal.

Bradley Stoke Matters is a free community magazine and website which started up in 2005, following local news and events. The free magazine is delivered quarterly to every home in Bradley Stoke.

The Bradley Stoke Journal is a free interactive community news website since 2007, following local news and events. From 2013 the free magazine was delivered monthly to every home in Bradley Stoke. The magazine ceased printed publication in May 2022, but the website and social media channels continued.

Radio
Bradley Stoke Radio, the local community radio station, broadcasts over the internet via webcasts and on 103.4  MHz FM. Live broadcasts are regularly held during local community events, in Willow Brook Shopping Centre's town square, and at local festivals, featuring live singers and commentary directly from the events.

Bradley Stoke receives Heart West Radio on 96.3  MHz FM and BBC Radio Bristol on 94.9  MHz FM.

Television
Bradley Stoke is covered by and has featured on the local television channel Bristol TV, formerly known as Made in Bristol TV.

The regional television services are BBC West and ITV West Country.

Crime

Bradley Stoke is served by Avon and Somerset Constabulary. Bradley Stoke Town Council funds a dedicated police officer for the town. There is a local police beat surgery office located in the Willow Brook Centre Avon and Somerset Constabulary were criticised in early 2019 for having no active Police Community Support Officers (PCSO). A police presence has since been reinstated.

Bradley Stoke benefits from a low crime rate compared to other areas of Bristol. However, in 2018, the crime rate reached its highest level for 5 years with over 100 crimes reported in the month of June. The supermarket, leisure centre, petrol filling station and nearby pub were hotspots for the most frequent crimes Incidents involving arson, threats towards children and multiple counts of indecent exposure were reported in the area.

Numerous acts of vandalism were reported around the Three Brooks Nature Reserve over the May Bank Holiday weekend in 2019. Incidents included two counts of theft, destruction of wildlife housing, damage to the Three Brooks Local Nature Reserve signage and installations. An incident that occurred involving a community project to decorate roundabouts involved intoxicated individuals stealing an ornamental animal. The animal was returned but later damaged in a separate incident involving a car driving over the roundabout.

The Avon and Somerset police crime statistics record that between May 2018 and April 2019 at least 900 crimes were reported in the Bradley Stoke area. The crimes included 230 reports of anti-social behaviour (25.56%) and 256 reports of violence and sexual offences (28.44%). Other offences included bicycle theft, burglary, criminal damage and arson, drugs offences, possession of weapons, public order offences, robbery, shoplifting and vehicle crime.

References

External links

 Bradley Stoke Town Council
 

Areas of Bristol
Housing estates in Gloucestershire
Towns in Gloucestershire
South Gloucestershire District